Davao del Norte's 2nd congressional district is one of the two congressional districts of the Philippines in the province of Davao del Norte. It has been represented in the House of Representatives since 1987. The district covers the western and coastal areas of the province, namely the cities of Panabo and Samal, and the municipalities of Braulio E. Dujali, Carmen and Santo Tomas. Prior to redistricting in 1998, the district covered parts of what is now the province of Davao de Oro, as well as the capital, Tagum, in what is now the 1st district. It is currently represented in the 19th Congress by Alan R. Dujali of the Hugpong ng Pagbabago (HNP).

Representation history

Election results

2022

2019

2016

2013

2010

See also
Legislative districts of Davao del Norte

References

Congressional districts of the Philippines
Politics of Davao del Norte
1987 establishments in the Philippines
Congressional districts of the Davao Region
Constituencies established in 1987